Tenoa is a genus of moths belonging to the subfamily Tortricinae of the family Tortricidae. It's only species is Tenoa curicoana. It is found in Chile.

See also
List of Tortricidae genera

References

 Razowski, J., 1994: Synopsis of the Neotropical Cochylini (Lepidoptera: Tortricidae). Acta Zoologica Cracoviensia 37: 121-320 (258).
 Razowski, J., 2011: Diagnoses and remarks on genera of Tortricidae, 2: Cochylini (Lepidoptera: Tortricidae). Shilap Revista de Lepidopterologia 39 (156): 397–414.

External links
tortricidae.com

Cochylini
Tortricidae genera
Moths described in 1994
Endemic fauna of Chile